is a Japanese footballer currently playing as a left midfielder for Nagano Parceiro, on loan from Matsumoto Yamaga.

Career statistics

Club

Notes

References

External links

2000 births
Living people
Sportspeople from Mie Prefecture
Association football people from Mie Prefecture
Japanese footballers
Association football defenders
Association football midfielders
J2 League players
J3 League players
Matsumoto Yamaga FC players
Montedio Yamagata players
AC Nagano Parceiro players